Susan Hawthorne (born 30 November 1951) is an Australian writer, poet, political commentator and publisher. Together with Renate Klein, she is co-founder and director of Spinifex Press, a leading independent feminist publisher that celebrated its 25th anniversary in 2016 in Melbourne with a festival of radical feminism. She and Klein were named winners of the George Robertson Award, which recognises publishers with 30 years or more service to publishing.

Career
Hawthorne is an expert in feminist publishing as well as independent publishing generally. She is the English language co-ordinator of the International Alliance of Independent Publishers (based in Paris). Hawthorne has a doctorate in Women's Studies and Political Science from the University of Melbourne, as well as post graduate qualifications in Ancient Greek and Sanskrit and a Bachelor of Arts (Hons) in Philosophy from La Trobe University. She is an Adjunct Professor in the Writing Program at James Cook University.

Hawthorne is also an aerialist and circus performer. She has performed solo and in the Performing Older Women's Circus as well as in the Melbourne's Women's Circus.

Writing
Hawthorne's writing includes poetry, fiction and non-fiction books.

Her poetry collection Cow was shortlisted for the 2012 Kenneth Slessor Poetry Prize in the NSW Premier's Literary Awards and the Audre Lorde Lesbian Poetry Prize (USA). Her poetry collection Earth's Breath was shortlisted for the 2010 Judith Wright Poetry Prize.

Her novel The Falling Woman was selected as one of The Australian's Year's Best Books (1992) and a Top Twenty Title in the Listener Women's Book Festival (NZ).

The Spinifex Quiz Book was a finalist in The Australian Educational Publishing Awards (1993) and Wild Politics: Feminism, Globalisation and Biodiversity was included in Australian Book Review's list of Best Books for 2002.

Hawthorne has been the recipient of two international residencies: in 2013 from the Australia Council for the Arts for six months to write Lupa and Lamb in Rome and in 2009 a four-month residency for Arts Queensland and the Australia Council to Chennai, India to write Cow.

Hawthorne's work has been published in Australia and internationally in anthologies and literary magazines, in the annual Best Australian Poems (three times) and broadcast on Radio National's Poetica.

Bibliography
Hawthorne, S & Klein, R. Angels of Power, 1991
Hawthorne, S, The Spinifex Quiz Book, 1993
Hawthorne, S & Klein R., Australia for Women: Travel & Culture, 1994
Hawthorne, S & Dunsford, C., Car Maintenance, Explosives and Love, 1997
Hawthorne, S & Klein R., Cyberfeminism, 1999
Hawthorne, S., Bird, 1999
Hawthorne, S, Wild Politics: Feminism, Globalisation and Biodiversity, 2002
Hawthorne, S & Fook, J., Cat Tales: The Meaning of Cats in Women's Lives, 2004
Hawthorne, S & Fook, J., Horse Dreams: The meaning of Horses in Women's Lives, 2005
Hawthorne, S, The Butterfly Effect, 2006
Hawthorne, S, The Falling Woman, 2006
Hawthorne, S  & Winter, B., September 11, 2001: Feminist Perspectives, 2007
Hawthorne, S, Cow, 2011
Hawthorne, S, Valence: Considering War through Poetry and Theory, 2012
Hawthorne, S, Earth's Breath, 2012
Hawthorne, S, Limen, 2013
Hawthorne, S., Bibliodiversity: A Manifesto for Independent Publishing, 2014
Hawthorne, S., Lupa and Lamb, 2014
Hawthorne, S., Dark Matters: A Novel, 2017
Hawthorne, S., Vortex: The Crisis of Patriarchy, 2020
Klein, R. & Hawthorne, S., (eds.) Not Dead Yet: Feminism, Passion and Women’s Liberation, 2021

References

External links

Australian writers
Australian publishers (people)
1951 births
Living people
Australian women writers